The 1969–70 Marquette Warriors men's basketball team represented Marquette University during the 1969–70 men's college basketball season. The Warriors finished the regular season with a record of 26–3. The season is particularly notable as coach Al McGuire turned down a bid to the 1970 NCAA Tournament after the committee placed the tenth-ranked Warriors in the Midwest region instead of the geographically closer Mideast, the first team to ever take this action. McGuire opted to play in the 1970 National Invitation Tournament instead, where they defeated Massachusetts, Utah and LSU to advance to the NIT championship where they defeated St. John's to become NIT champions. As a direct result of this action, the NCAA forbid its members from declining NCAA tournament bids when offered moving forward.

Roster

Schedule

References 

Marquette Golden Eagles men's basketball seasons
Marquette
Marquette
National Invitation Tournament championship seasons
Marq
Marq